Pietro Ubaldo Bianchi (14 March 1895 – 21 May 1962) was an Italian weightlifter who competed in the 1920 Summer Olympics. In 1920 he won the silver medal in the middleweight class.

References

External links
 
 

1895 births
1962 deaths
Italian male weightlifters
Olympic weightlifters of Italy
Olympic silver medalists for Italy
Olympic medalists in weightlifting
Weightlifters at the 1920 Summer Olympics
Medalists at the 1920 Summer Olympics
20th-century Italian people